Hadji Dawud (1680 – 1735) was a Lezgin military commander and Islamic religious leader who was influential in the resistance against Safavids imperialist expansion into the Caucasus during the late 17th century. Hadji Dawud is considered the first leader of the resistance in Caucasus against Persian imperialism. He remains a hero of the Lezgin and Dagestan peoples in general, and their struggle for independence.

Biography 
Imam Hadji-Dawud was born around 1680 in the village of Titel/Dedeli (currently the village is populated mainly by Azerbaijanis) in the territory of Shirvan. Since childhood, he was distinguished by intelligence and courage. Already in the sources of the 1710-the 1720s, he was referred to as a “bek and Lezghin owner”. In addition to his native Lezgi, he knew Arabic, which was in high esteem among the Lezghins, as well as Turkish and Persian languages.

War against Shia 
In 1705-1707, the Shia Qizilbash unleashed terror against the Sunni Lezgins. During this period, Haji-Dawud managed to unite the scattered detachments of the insurgent Lezgins and led an uprising against the Shia. 

In the spring of 1721, the combined detachments of Haji Dawood and Surhay Khan I approached Shamakha. The Shamakha fugitive Khasan Khan made a sortie with his army, intending to defeat the rebels in open battle. In the course of a fierce battle that ensued near the city, the Safavid troops suffered a complete defeat: part of the Persian-Qizilbash army was exterminated right on the battlefield, and the other fled, and the fugitive himself was killed. Pursuing the retreating, the rebels broke into the city.

The capture of Shemakha was published in the manifesto of Peter I 1712 thus:

References 

Lezgins
Dagestan
1680 births
1735 deaths